The NWA Americas Heavyweight Championship was the top singles championship in the National Wrestling Alliance's Los Angeles territory, known officially as NWA Hollywood Wrestling, from 1968 until the promotion closed in 1982. The title was first established in 1967 as a secondary championship in NWA Hollywood's predecessor, Worldwide Wrestling Associates. Although the name of the title implies that it was defended throughout North, Central and South America, it was rarely defended outside of Southern California. As a result, the title was essentially a regional title rather than a national one. A number of NWA affiliated promoters at various points over the years have used their own regional versions or variations of "national" championships for the purpose of giving crowds the idea that the company was larger than it actually was, or that the company was the biggest or most successful within the ranks of the National Wrestling Alliance.

Title history

References

External links
NWA Americas Heavyweight title history at Wrestling-titles.com

National Wrestling Alliance championships
NWA Hollywood Wrestling championships